Joan Ballweg (née Gottinger; born March 16, 1952) is an American politician and legislator, currently serving in the Wisconsin State Senate, representing the 14th senatorial district.  She previously served eight terms in the Wisconsin State Assembly and was Mayor of Markesan, Wisconsin.  She is a member of the Republican Party.

Early life and education
Born in Milwaukee, Wisconsin, she graduated from Nathan Hale High School in 1970 before attending the University of Wisconsin–Waukesha and receiving a B.A. from the University of Wisconsin–Stevens Point in 1974. She is married to Tom Ballweg, with whom she has four children.

Career
Ballweg worked as a first grade teacher from 1974 to 1976 in Memphis, Tennessee. She started Ballweg Implement Company, Inc. in December 1976 with her husband, Tom. Ballweg served as an alderperson on the Markesan, Wisconsin, Common Council from 1986 to 1989 and was the city's mayor from 1990 to 1996. Ballweg was elected to the Wisconsin State Assembly in 2004 and reelected seven times, serving until 2020. She served on the following committees in the Assembly: Chair of Labor & Workforce Development, Colleges and Universities and State Affairs and Homeland Security. She also served as co-chair of the Joint Legislative Council and as a member of the Wisconsin Building Commission. In addition to her legislative assignments, she is a member of the Federal Emergency Management Agency (FEMA) Region V Advisory Council.

In 2020, she was elected to the Wisconsin State Senate replacing retiring state senator Luther Olsen.

References

External links
Joan Ballweg for State Assembly Official Campaign Website
Ballweg Implement Co., Inc.

1952 births
Living people
Politicians from Milwaukee
People from Markesan, Wisconsin
University of Wisconsin–Stevens Point alumni
Women mayors of places in Wisconsin
Wisconsin city council members
Mayors of places in Wisconsin
Republican Party members of the Wisconsin State Assembly
Republican Party Wisconsin state senators
Women state legislators in Wisconsin
21st-century American politicians
21st-century American women politicians
Women city councillors in Wisconsin